Sport Clube Freamunde is a Portuguese football club based in Freamunde, Paços de Ferreira. Founded on 19 March 1933, it currently plays in the Campeonato de Portugal, holding home matches at the 4,000-capacity Complexo Desportivo do SC Freamunde.

José Bosingwa, who later achieved fame with Porto, Chelsea and the Portugal national team, began his professional career at Freamunde.

History
Freamunde started when cardinal António Filipe watched a group of children playing in the streets of Freamunde, and decided to start a club, arranging for kits gratuitously. It was first called Freamunde Sport Clube.

Another clergyman, Padre Castro, was the main responsible for the club's early professional foundations. In 1933, the team started playing matches in a field owned by him, the Campo do Carvalhal. Two years later, the club started competing in Liga Invicta – known in later years as the second division – doning the colours which would last for the following decades: blue shirt and socks and white shorts. The league folded however two years later, and the team started playing in Campeonato da Promoção, after joining Porto's Football Association.

In 1944, Freamunde's first status were outlined – five years later, Castro died. In 1999, after two consecutive promotions, the club first reached the new second level, lasting two seasons, and returning again for the 2007–08 campaign after being crowned champions of the third division (Northern Zone); during the early 1990s and the 2000s, Jorge Regadas served as team manager for several seasons.

Current squad
As of 27 January 2017.

Honours
Third-tier leagues:
Portuguese Second Division 1998–99, 2006–07
Campeonato Nacional de Seniores 2013–14

League and cup history

Last updated: 30 July 2015
Div. = Division; ; 2H = Liga de Honra; 2DS = Segunda Divisão; 3DS = Terceira Divisão; CN = Campeonato Nacional
Pos. = Position; Pl = Match played; W = Win; D = Draw; L = Lost; GS = Goal scored; GA = Goal against; P = Points

Managerial history

 Jorge Regadas (1989–1992)
 Jorge Regadas (1997–1998)
 Sá Pereira (1998)
 Jorge Regadas (1998–1999)
 Carlos Carvalhal (2000)
 Sá Pereira (2001–2002)
 João Mário (2002–2003)
 Nicolau Vaqueiro (2003–2004)
 Antero Nunes (2004–2005)
 Jorge Regadas (2006–2010)
 Nicolau Vaqueiro (2010 – June 2012)
 Nuno Sousa (June 2012 – October 2012)
 João Eusébio (October 2012 – February 2013)
 Jorge Regadas (February 2013 – May 2013)
 Carlos Pinto (June 2013– January 2016)
 Micael Sequeira (January 2017)

References

External links
Official website 
Zerozero team profile

 
Football clubs in Portugal
Association football clubs established in 1933
1933 establishments in Portugal
Liga Portugal 2 clubs